The 1987 Vuelta a España was the 42nd edition of the Vuelta a España, one of cycling's Grand Tours. The Vuelta began in Benidorm, with a prologue individual time trial on 23 April, and Stage 12 occurred on 5 May with a stage from Cangas de Onís. The race finished in Madrid on 15 May.

Stage 12
5 May 1987 — Cangas de Onís to Oviedo,

Stage 13
6 May 1987 — Luarca to Ferrol,

Stage 14
7 May 1987 — Ferrol to A Coruña,

Stage 15
8 May 1987 — A Coruña to Vigo,

Stage 16
9 May 1987 — Ponteareas to Ponferrada,

Stage 17
10 May 1987 — Ponferrada to Valladolid,

Stage 18
11 May 1987 — Valladolid to Valladolid,  (ITT)

Stage 19
12 May 1987 — El Barco de Ávila to Ávila,

Stage 20
13 May 1987 — Ávila to Palazuelos de Eresma (Destilerías DYC),

Stage 21
14 May 1987 — Palazuelos de Eresma (Destilerías DYC) to Collado Villalba,

Stage 22
15 May 1987 — Alcalá de Henares to Madrid,

References

1987 Vuelta a España
Vuelta a España stages